Muteb Al-Hammad (Arabic:متعب الحماد, born 13 August 1998) is a Saudi football player. He currently plays for Al-Qadsiah on loan from Al-Hazem.

On 27 January 2023, Al-Hammad joined Al-Qadsiah on loan.

External links

References

1998 births
Living people
Saudi Arabian footballers
Saudi Arabia youth international footballers
Al-Alameen Club players
Al Nassr FC players
Al Batin FC players
Damac FC players
Al-Kawkab FC players
Al-Thoqbah Club players
Al-Hazem F.C. players
Al-Ain FC (Saudi Arabia) players
Al-Qadsiah FC players
Association football forwards
Saudi Professional League players
Saudi First Division League players